Ball Lightning is a hard science fiction novel by Chinese author Liu Cixin. The original Chinese version was published in 2004. In 2018 the English version, translated by Joel Martinsen, was published in the US by Tor Books.

Plot

The novel follows the experiences of a first-person protagonist, Chen, whose family was killed by ball lightning while he was in high school. Both traumatized and inspired by that experience, he makes the investigation of ball lightning his life's work, first getting his PhD in the subject, then exploring the phenomenon through both applied and theoretical research. During his research, military technology researcher Lin Yun recruits him into a weapons development team. 

With the help of a theoretical physicist, Ding Yi, they discover that ball lightning is not formed by lightning conditions, but rather when lightning encounters "macro-electrons" hypercharging the electrons until they express their energy. They learn how to capture these macro-electrons and turn them into a weapon that can destroy targeted types of matter; wood, stone, or even microprocessors. After building the weapon and forming a specialized military unit to use the device, they successfully deploy the weapon against anti-technology eco-terrorists who try to blow up a nuclear plant, but kill a group of schoolchildren that had been held hostage. Disillusioned, Chen leaves the military research group. Ding Yi explains to Chen that those killed by macro-electrons, including his parents, exist in a quantum state that can occasionally influence the world when not observed.

Using a technology developed over the course of his ball lightning research, Chen develops a strategy for tracking tornado formation. American scientists combine that technology with missiles to suppress tornado formation in the American Midwest. When war breaks out between the U.S. and China, the U.S. uses a similar application of Chen's technology to form tornadoes as a weapon to destroy naval vessels.

Living daily life in wartime China, Chen is surprised to one day find that all the microprocessors in the city have been incinerated.  Ding Yi finds Chen and recounts that he and Lin's research group had progressed beyond macro-electrons to find macro-nuclei as well, creating the possibility of "macro-fusion," which would combine the power of conventional nuclear weapons with the matter-selectivity of ball lightning.  The Chinese military, fearing the consequences of such technology, shut down the research, but Lin disobeys orders and starts the planned macro-fusion trial, at the cost of her own life.  The reaction destroyed microprocessors across a vast swathe of China, and as the world recognizes the power of any future macro-fusion events to wipe out advanced weaponry across a theater of war, an armistice is signed.

The remains of Lin Yun, despite their probabilistic nature, have enough decoherence to sustain a heartfelt conversation with her father. They later deliver an invisible rose to Chen. A photograph in Ding Yi's apartment indicates that Lin Yun's quantum state can even lend temporary visibility to the child victims of the nuclear plant. At the end of the novel, an American ball lightning researcher visits Chen and they discuss his latest research.  The Americans had found that in several trials, ball lightning behaved as though an observer was present, despite the experiment being held deep in a mineshaft with no human observers.

Notes

References

External links
 

2004 novels
2004 science fiction novels
Novels by Liu Cixin
Hard science fiction